Cloak of Aesir is a collection of science fiction stories by American writer John W. Campbell, Jr. It was published in 1952 by Shasta Publishers in an edition of 5,000 copies.  The stories originally appeared in the magazine Astounding SF under Campbell's pseudonym Don A. Stuart.

Contents
 Introduction
 "Forgetfulness"
 "The Escape"
 "The Machine"
 "The Invaders"
 "Rebellion"
 "Out of Night"
 "Cloak of Aesir"

Six of the seven stories were later included in the 1976 collection The Best of John W. Campbell (Ballantine/Del Rey).

Reception
Writing in The New York Times, J. Francis McComas "warmly recommended" Cloak of Aesir, noting that "none of these stories follows its chosen path to an expected destination." Groff Conklin characterized the collection as "somewhat overwritten, but still well done." Boucher and McComas, however, praised Cloak for the stories' "amazing modernity of concept and extrapolation [and their] rarely achieved combination of original thinking and high adventure.". P. Schuyler Miller praised the collection as "all top-notch idea-stories . . . laying the foundations of the more adult stuff we know today."

References

Sources

External links
 

1952 short story collections
Science fiction short story collections
Works originally published in Analog Science Fiction and Fact